Anuj-e Olya (also Romanized as Anūj-e ʿOlyā) is a village in Borborud-e Gharbi Rural District, in the Central District of Aligudarz County, Lorestan Province, Iran. At the 2006 census, its population was 48, in 9 families.

References 

Towns and villages in Aligudarz County